Koorlong is a locality in Victoria, Australia located approximately 15 km south west of Mildura.

Located in Koorlong is the 1/8-mile Sunset Strip dragstrip, the Jambaroo Park motorcycle sports complex and the Koorlong Primary School. The Post Office opened on 1 January 1912 and continues to operate alongside Koorlong Store, including a bottleshop, general store and takeaway food.

1943 mid-air collision
On 21 January 1943, two RAAF Wirraway trainers collided over the town. 3 crew members were killed, with only the instructor of one aircraft surviving.

References

Towns in Victoria (Australia)
Mallee (Victoria)